The Municipality of Kanal ob Soči ( or) is a municipality in the traditional region of the Littoral in western Slovenia. The seat of the municipality is the town of Kanal. Kanal ob Soči became a municipality in 1994.

Settlements
In addition to the municipal seat of Kanal, the municipality also includes the following settlements:

 Ajba
 Anhovo
 Avče
 Bodrež
 Čolnica
 Deskle
 Doblar
 Dolenje Nekovo
 Goljevica
 Gorenja Vas
 Gorenje Nekovo
 Gorenje Polje
 Jesen
 Kal nad Kanalom
 Kambreško
 Kamenca nad Ložicami
 Kanalski Vrh
 Krstenica
 Levpa
 Lig
 Ložice
 Močila
 Morsko
 Paljevo
 Plave
 Prilesje pri Plavah
 Ravna
 Robidni Breg
 Ročinj
 Seniški Breg
 Ukanje
 Zagomila
 Zagora
 Zapotok

References

External links

Municipality of Kanal ob Soči on Geopedia
Kanal ob Soči municipal site

Kanal ob Soči
1994 establishments in Slovenia